Gray Poupon is the second album by underground rapper and Army of the Pharaohs member Doap Nixon. The album is named after the mustard Grey Poupon. It was officially released via Q-Demented on 28 February 2011.

Background
Early 2011, Doap stepped forward with his sophomore album; Gray Poupon. It was known for Doap asserting his voice and perspective, outside of his lyrical cartel. Doap raps about his catalog, listing credits and collaborations, and compares them against other emcees ascending into the public eye.

The album included appearances from fellow Army of the Pharaohs members; Celph Titled, Journalist, Block McCloud, Planetary, Crypt the Warchild and former member Chief Kamachi. Other artist including; Killa Rellik, Sick Six, Capo & Burke the Jurke were also featured on the album. The album was officially released on 28 February 2011 on iTunes, via Q-Demented.

Track listing

References

2011 albums
Babygrande Records albums
Doap Nixon albums